Fountain Green is a city in Sanpete County, Utah, United States. The population was 1,071 at the 2010 census.

History
Fountain Green was originally called "Uintah Springs", and under the latter name settlement was made in 1859. A post office called Fountain Green has been in operation since 1860.  The present name is for springs and green pastures near the original town site.

Geography
Fountain Green is located at  (39.627653, -111.639310).

Demographics
As of the census of 2010, there were 1071 people and 370 households, 88.4% of which were occupied housing units. The population density was 705 people per square mile. The racial makeup of the city was 89.07% White, 0.10% African American, 0.60% Native American, and 1.73% from other races. Hispanic or Latino of any race were 8.50% of the population.

Education
Fountain Green is located in the North Sanpete School District and contains an elementary school. Students attend North Sanpete Middle School in Moroni and North Sanpete High School in Mount Pleasant.

Events
The annual city celebration is Lamb Day. Held in July of each year, it is famous for its pit cooking of over 30 lambs made into delicious lamb sandwiches. The event includes a play, mutton busting, carnival, softball games, a fun run, and a great parade down State Street.

See also

 List of cities and towns in Utah
 Fountain Green Massacre

References

External links

 

Cities in Utah
Cities in Sanpete County, Utah
Populated places established in 1859
1859 establishments in Utah Territory